The Barrie Gaol, colloquially referred to as the Barrie Bucket, located at 87 Mulcaster Street in Barrie, Ontario, Canada, was a maximum-security facility housing offenders awaiting, trial, sentencing or transfer to federal and provincial correctional facilities, opened in 1841 and closed in 2001. It was replaced by the Central North Correctional Centre in the town of Penetanguishene, about 47 km northwest of Barrie.

The gaol was designed by Toronto architect Thomas Young, who subscribed to the contemporary theory that a polygonal structure would make the occupants feel less confined. Construction of the gaol began in 1840. It is built from limestone from the quarry at Longford on the east side of Lake Couchiching.

Five prisoners were hanged at this location: James Carruthers age 48 on 11 June 1873 for the murder of his wife; John Tryon age 47, on Dec 30, 1873 for the murder of Francis Fisher; George O'Neil, 47 years, on Jan 4, 1929, for the murders of Azor Robertson and Ruby Irene Martin; Thomas Wesley Campbell, age 54, on Jan 4, 1932, for the murder of William Campbell, his father;  Lloyd Wellington Simcoe, age 18 in 1945 for murder. Others died during incarceration and are believed to be buried in the inner courtyard.

The last inmate to reside at the Barrie Gaol was transferred to the Penetanguishene 'superjail' on December 7, 2001. It remains vacant to this day.

The gaol served as the primary filming location for the movie Dark Reprieve (2008).

See also 
 List of correctional facilities in Ontario

References

Buildings and structures in Barrie
Defunct prisons in Ontario
1842 establishments in Canada
2001 disestablishments in Ontario
History of Simcoe County